Vulgarnyj toNN was a Russian rap group from Vladivostok. They consisted of rAp, Ksandra, CLassic, Kore, and OST.

They disbanded in 2011.

History
Vulgarnyj toNN were formed on July 27th, 2005. Originally the band consisted of only rAp and OST. By 2006 singer Ksandra and MC CLassic had joined the band. In 2009 Kore was recruited to form the band's current roster. In 2009, Nikita (OST) moved to Moscow where he met the bands Rynochnye Otnosheniya and Chernaya Ekonomika, he then proceeded to release a solo album and a number of tracks in collaboration with the bands; OST releases of Vulgarnyj toNN have since then been lowered to a minimum, however, OST is still officially considered a member of the band.

Participations in rap-battles

Hip-Hop.Ru Battles
Since its formation, Vulgarnyj toNN has often taken part in rap-battles, as a team and as single MC. In 2007, the band took part in the "5th command battle Hip-Hop.Ru" competition and has been defeated in the finals by band Mychanie Yagnyat, led by well-known rap artist Maestro A-Sid.

Team battle "Ostatsya v Zhivyh"
In 2007, Vulgarnyj toNN won the team battle "Ostatsya v Zhivyh" (Russian for Lost), organized by the site RapVladivostok.ru, which involved rap bands from Primorsky Krai of Russia.

InDaRnB.ru battles
Single rap battles by IndaRnB.ru also attracted the attention of members of Vulgarnyj toNN. rAp and CLassic took part in the first InDaRnB.ru battle, they were joined by Kore in the second battle. Of the three, however, only CLassic has achieved success. In the first InDaBattle CLassic reached the semi-final, lost there a future winner: Chet - largely because of disagreements with one of the judges, which is David Nuriev, known by the pseudonym of Ptaha. However, then CLassic took part in the festival "InDaBattle," which involved the winners and semifinalists of the battle, and special guests with concert program.

Then CLassic took part in second battle - InDaBattle 2, and, despite the new conflicts with the judges - the organizers of the battle - Snake and rapper SD, CLassic reached the final and again lost against the future winner - 18-year-old rap-artist from Latvia - Johnyboy, which won the final round with score 5-2.

Awards

Hip-Hop.Ru Awards 2009
Vulgarnyj toNN won in the nomination "Best rap-band/flava of 2009". The solo album of CLassic, "Otvertka, vokrug kotoryj vraschaetsya mir," took 2nd place in the nomination "Best Hip-Hop album of 2009," and singer Ksandra took 2nd place in the nomination "Best Hip-Hop girl-singer in 2009"

Band members
 rAp — Aleksandr Epov (October 6, 1987, Ussuriysk)
 OST — Nikita Savinkin (March 14, 1987, Vladivostok)
 Ksandra — Aleksandra Shabalina (September 28, 1990, Vladivostok)
 CLassic — Viktor Stelmah (January 4, 1987, Vladivostok)
 Kore — Denis Kotelnikov (December 8, 1986, Vladivostok)

Discography

Studio albums
 2007: Vulgarnyj toNN — "Proba Pera" (Russian for "First attempt at writing")

Mixtapes
 2008: Vulgarnyj toNN — "Vulgarnyj KTO?" (Russian for "Vulgar WHO?")
 2008: Kore — "The Phantom"

Solo albums
 2008: Ksandra — "Maski" (Russian for "Masks")
 2009: CLassic — "Otvertka, Vokrug Kotoroy Vraschaetsya Mir" (Russian for "Screw-driver Round Which the World Rotates")
 2009: rAp, Kore — "Vidish Raznitsu?" (Russian for "Do you see the Difference?")
 2010: OST — "O.S.T. 2008-2010"
 2010: Kore — "Zri v Koren" (Russian for "Get at the root")

Music videos
 2009: «Kto, esli ne my?» feat. GidroPonka, 228
 2010: «My nauchim tebya, kak» feat. FASTA

References

External links
 CLassic – "Отвертка вокруг которой вращается мир" на rap.ru 
 rAp и Kore - "Видишь Разницу" на InDaRnB.ru 
 Kore - "Зри в Koreнь" на RapVladivostok.ru 
 Hip-Hop.Ru Awards 2009 - Results of Voting 
 Вульгарный тонн – “Не так, как принято у всех” 
 Вульгарный тоНН - о сотрудничестве с 228 и Гидропонкой, ближайших релизах и планах группы 
 Classic: "Я готов к любому сопернику..." 
 CLassic: "Выбранный мною путь оказался крайне тернистым..." 
 Classic: С быдлом надо разговаривать на их языке 
 CLassic - «Пока баттлы приносят мне рост, я буду в деле» 
 Classic и OST: Мы не хотим быть похожими на Касту 
 Денис Kore - о своём альбоме «Зри в корень», планах на будущее и о не согласии с нынешней политикой государства 
 rAP и Kore: Мы вместе с одного года 
 Интервью с Kore и Ksandra 
 Рецензия на альбом "Видишь Разницу" 

Musical groups established in 2005
Russian hip hop groups
Russian hip hop
Russian rappers
Russian hip hop musicians